The Czar's Courier is a 1936 German historical drama film directed by Richard Eichberg and starring Anton Walbrook, Lucie Höflich, and Maria Andergast. It is an adaptation of Jules Verne's 1876 novel Michael Strogoff.

It was shot at the Johannisthal Studios in Berlin and on location in Bulgaria. The film's sets were designed by the art directors Willi Herrmann and Alfred Bütow. A separate French-language version, Michel Strogoff, was also produced.

Cast

See also
The Soldier and the Lady (1937)

References

Bibliography

External links

1930s historical drama films
German historical drama films
Films of Nazi Germany
Films directed by Richard Eichberg
Tobis Film films
Films shot at Johannisthal Studios
Films based on Michael Strogoff
Films set in Russia
Films shot in Bulgaria
Films set in the 19th century
German multilingual films
German black-and-white films
1936 multilingual films
1930s German-language films
1930s German films